Histria Shipmanagement is a Romanian shipping company, the largest in the country, with a fleet of eleven vessels of which ten are oil and chemical tankers and one is a multipurpose vessel.

Ships
 Histria Diamond —  oil tanker
 Histria Perla —  oil and chemical tanker
 Histria Coral —  oil and chemical tanker
 Histria Ivory —  oil and chemical tanker
 Histria Agata —  oil and chemical tanker
 Histria Giada —  oil and chemical tanker
 Histria Onyx —  multipurpose vessel
 Histria Tiger —  oil and chemical tanker
 Histria Azure —  oil and chemical tanker
 Histria Prince —  oil and chemical tanker
 Histria Topaz —  oil and chemical tanker

External links
 Official site

Shipping companies of Romania
Companies based in Constanța